Zoraida Ávalos Rivera (born 14 June 1957) is a Peruvian jurist who served as the country's  from 8 January 2019 to 30 March 2022.

Biography
Zoraida Ávalos was born in Callao on 14 June 1957. She graduated from the National University of San Marcos in 1981 with a law degree, and completed her master's and doctorate degrees at Federico Villarreal National University.

On 2 August 2018, prosecutor  and former attorney general  both argued that Ávalos should take over as the new attorney general. On 8 August, the IDL-Reporteros journalist Gustavo Gorriti described Ávalos as "the best qualified person to assume the office of Attorney General," given the judicial conflict that had started with the CNM Audios scandal, which implicated incumbent attorney general .

On 22 August, she was appointed by Chávarry as the new head of the Supreme Attorney's Office of Internal Control, replacing Jorge Antonio Bernal Cavero.

On 6 January 2019, one day after Chávarry presented his letter of resignation due to media pressure, Sánchez reiterated his support for Ávalos assuming the office of attorney general. Two days later, she was appointed interim attorney general, pending an election by the Board of Supreme Attorneys. On 7 March, she was ratified in office for a three-year term.

Controversies 
During the 2014 election for a new attorney general for the 2015–2018 term, Ávalos voted for Carlos Ramos Heredia, cousin of then first lady Nadine Heredia. He had come under scrutiny for mismanagement as head of the Organ of Internal Control of the Attorney General's Office, as well as obstruction of justice. Ávalos defended her decision, stating, "I feel that I am being sentenced for voting for Ramos Heredia, but in a state of law I have the right to choose."

On 28 April 2014, two attorneys filed a complaint in which they alleged that the National Board of Justice (under the influence of Heredia) had acted in a biased manner to favor Ávalos and another attorney, Nora Miraval Gambini, with their appointments to the Board of Supreme Attorneys, despite having failed written exams required to belong to said body. In exchange, they contended, Heredia received the votes of the new board members to be elected as attorney general.

References

External links
 

1957 births
20th-century Peruvian lawyers
21st-century women lawyers
Attorneys general
Federico Villarreal National University alumni
Living people
National University of San Marcos alumni
People from Callao
21st-century Peruvian lawyers
Peruvian women lawyers